Gianni Capaldi is a Scottish actor and film and television producer.

Early life and education 
Born in Hamilton, South Lanarkshire to parents Tony and Maria, Capaldi grew up in the town and went to St Mary's Primary School followed by Hamilton College before continuing his education at Glasgow Caledonian University. Before going into acting he played youth football with Motherwell. He is related to Scottish entertainers Jimmy Logan, Lewis Capaldi and Peter Capaldi.

Career

Acting 
Capaldi first role was appearing in the comedy film All In (2005). Although he has starred in various genre pieces ranging from drama to horror, he is mostly known in the action world appearing in blockbusters such as Blood of Redemption, Puncture Wounds, and Nightworld.

Capaldi's first major role, where he portrayed a British gangster called English, saw him star alongside Brian Austin Green, Michael Clarke Duncan, Vinnie Jones, Danny Trejo and Tom Sizemore in the action Sony picture film Cross . Capaldi worked alongside Morgan Freeman in the children's film, Wish Wizard, a film made in collaboration with the Make a Wish Foundation. then in the paranormal moralistic drama The Between, with Isabelle Fuhrman, Joel Courtney and Peter Bogdanovich. Capaldi briefly expanded into television with appearances as himself in the HDnet reality television series Hollywood Royale.

Capaldi acting credits include Crossroads, romantic drama Don't Pass Me By, before teaming up with Jason Mewes for a web series, called Vigilante Diaries. Then he went onto star in Devil's Dozen, a horror feature directed by Jeremy London and also starring C. Thomas Howell, Jake Busey, Jeremy London and Eric Roberts, which premiered at Graumann's Chinese Theater in Hollywood in 2013

Capaldi starred in a trio of action films directed by Giorgio Serafini. In Ambushed, Capaldi portrays an uncontrollable Scottish gangster alongside Dolph Lundgren, Vinnie Jones and Randy Couture. Blood of Redemption, showcases the softer side of Capaldi as an American FBI agent, and brother to Billy Zane and nephew to Robert Davi, in a constant struggle to vindicate his fathers murder with Dolph Lundgren and Vinnie Jones, on opposite sides of the fence. Capaldi also produced A Certain Justice, starring alongside martial arts specialist, Cung Le, Dolph Lundgren, Vinnie Jones and Briana Evigan.

Capaldi then filmed a theatrically released horror feature in Italy about an urban witch legend Janara (2014) where he played an American priest. He continued with filming in Europe in the BBC comedy short film Gasping, set in Scotland with director Greg Hemphill and comedian Frankie Boyle. Gasping was nominated for Best Short Film at the 2015 Edinburgh Film Festival. Capaldi starred in Mickey Rooney's last film Jeckyl and Hyde, leading the cast as the despicable Edward Hyde where he teamed up with actor Margaret O'Brien. He then went on to work on Last Man's club, a family film alongside Jake Bussey, Richard Riedle and Kate French.

In 2015, Capaldi starred in Bite, an action horror film alongside Costas Mandylor and Vinnie Jones, directed by Alberto Sciamma which was shot in Rome. Capaldi  filmed Ghosts of Garip in Turkey playing the lead in an action adventure vampire driven horror alongside Selma Ergeç. This film has been released in theatres across Istanbul. Wicked Within was a gothic thriller executive produced by Courtney Solomon that highlights Capaldi's soft side as husband to a possessed wife, Sienna Guillory, and also stars Enzo Cilenti and Eric Roberts.

Capaldi costarred in Nightfall which was shot in Bulgaria, alongside Robert Englund, before joining up with Lindsay Lohan in Belgium and starring with her in The Shadow Within as a Lieutenant mixed up in a political world of vampires and werewolves. Capaldi led the cast alongside Dominique Swain in the film Deprivation which was shot in Rome and directed by Brian Skiba. Capaldi went on to film Chokehold in Canada starring with Casper Van Dien before heading to Turin, Italy to film thriller Ulysses with Danny Glover. Capaldi filmed Paper Empire in Miami, a television show alongside Wesley Snipes, Steve Guttenburg and Val Kilmer.

Capaldi filmed festival bound Cranley Gardens in December in London then he began filming in Alabama, on the Western Hell On The Border alongside Frank Grillo, Ron Perlman and Rudy Youngblood where he portrayed the famous Tom Pinkerton.

Robert the Bruce was alongside Angus MacFadyen (Braveheart's Robert The Bruce) which followed the story of the Scottish historical icon. October 2018 saw him film in Connecticut, a Universal Christmas movie called Adventures of Santa alongside Denise Richards then onto LA to film horror flick Circus Road. River Runs Red which Capaldi shot last December in Kentucky alongside John Cusack, Luke Hemsworth, Taye Diggs and George Lopez came out theatrically in January 2019 across the USA. Capaldi plays a cop alongside Hemsworth who find themselves in a  precarious position.

Capaldi filmed Christmas Movie for Universal Pictures, My Adventures for Santa, which was released in the Winter of 2019 alongside Barbara Eden and Denise Richards. Lionsgate's western, Hell On The Border, was released in November 2019 which saw Capaldi play Tom Pinkerton alongside Ron Perlman and Frank Grillo Capaldi then starred in action movie The Commando alongside Michael Jai White and Mickey Rourke which was shot in Albuquerque, New Mexico in 2020.

Deadline announced that Capaldi was cast alongside Bruce Willis and Frank Grillo in the movie A Day To Die.

Personal life 
He lives in Los Angeles, California.  He is married to former NFL San Diego Chargers cheerleader Amanda Fitz. On 18 April 2022, TV presenter Jean Johansson accused Capaldi of using bigoted language during a private message exchange with her on the social media platform Twitter. On 17 June 2022, Capaldi was involved in an incident of sectarian singing at the North American Celtic Supporters Federation in Las Vegas along with fellow actor Martin Compston.

Filmography

Producing 
His producing credits include attribution as an associate producer for the  Alien Express (2005) and 6 producer credits in The Martini Shot (2010), The Wicked Within (2010), Rush (2013), Blood of Redemption (2013), with recent Certain Justice (2013), and Badge of Honor (2014) added to his list.

References

External links 
 
 
 

1973 births
20th-century Scottish male actors
21st-century Scottish male actors
British people of Italian descent
Living people
People educated at Hamilton College, South Lanarkshire
Scottish expatriates in the United States
Scottish male film actors
Scottish male television actors
Scottish film producers
Scottish people of Italian descent
People from Hamilton, South Lanarkshire
Alumni of Glasgow Caledonian University
Date of birth missing (living people)